Taylor's Tenors is the second studio album by drummer Art Taylor. It was recorded and released in 1959 for Prestige sub-label New Jazz, as NJ 8219. The album was reissued on CD once in 1995.

Track listing 
"Rhythm-A-Ning" (Monk) - 6:51
"Little Chico" (Rouse) - 5:03
"Cape Millie" (Walter Davis Jr.) - 6:15
"Straight No Chaser" (Monk) - 5:43
"Fidel" (Jackie McLean) - 6:51
"Dacor" (Art Taylor) - 5:34

Personnel
Art Taylor - drums
Frank Foster, Charlie Rouse - tenor sax
Walter Davis Jr. - piano
Sam Jones - bass

References 

1959 albums
Albums produced by Bob Weinstock
New Jazz Records albums
Albums recorded at Van Gelder Studio
Art Taylor albums